Ivan Milas (18 October 1939 – 29 July 2011) was a Croatian lawyer and politician.

Milas was born in the village of Zmijavci near Imotski in Zagora, and graduated from the Faculty of Law at the University of Zagreb.

Milas was close to Marko Veselica and was active in the Croatian Spring in the early 1970s. In 1972, the authorities of communist Yugoslavia charged Milas with "actions against the state", arrested and spent six months in jail awaiting trial. He was released to prepare his defense, and subsequently fled to Austria where he received the status of a refugee. Yugoslavia sought his apprehension, which Austrian courts denied. He was tried in absentia in Yugoslavia and received a two-and-a-half-year prison sentence.

In 1988 Milas met the Croatian historian and politician Franjo Tuđman and in August 1989 joined his newly formed Croatian Democratic Union. Milas received a passport to return to Croatia in February 1990 and was elected to the Croatian Parliament in its first democratic elections.

During the first phase of the Croatian War of Independence between the summer of 1991 and the spring of 1992, Milas served as the Deputy Minister of Defence and Deputy Minister of Justice.

Milas was reelected in the 1992 election, and served as the Minister of Justice from June 6 to August 12, 1992 and was later vice-president in the Croatian Government, under Hrvoje Šarinić.

On May 28, 1995, President Tuđman awarded him with the Grand Order of King Dmitar Zvonimir. Also in May 1995, the function of the Keeper of the State Seal was created, and President Tuđman named Milas to the position on May 6, 1995, where he remained until February 1, 2000.  no other person was named to the position after Milas.
Milas was elected to Sabor again in the October 1995 election.

Between 1996 and 2000 Milas was a member of the Council of the Croatian National Bank.

He was last elected to the Croatian Parliament in the 2000 Croatian parliamentary election, where he served until late 2003, when he retired from politics.

Milas gained considerable notoriety in the Croatian public after he publicly expressed his opinion that in the West, brain is valued in kilograms.

Ivan Milas died in Zmijavci at the age of 72.

References

External links
 Ivan Milas - 4th assembly of the Croatian Parliament

1939 births
2011 deaths
Representatives in the modern Croatian Parliament
Croatian Democratic Union politicians
Faculty of Law, University of Zagreb alumni
Justice ministers of Croatia
People from Imotski